In Icelandic literature, a ríma (literally "a rhyme", pl. rímur) is an epic poem written in any of the so-called rímnahættir ("rímur meters"). They are rhymed, they alliterate and consist of two to four lines per stanza. The plural, rímur, is either used as an ordinary plural, denoting any two or more rímur, but is also used for more expansive works, containing more than one ríma as a whole. Thus Ólafs ríma Haraldssonar denotes an epic about Ólafr Haraldsson in one ríma, while Núma rímur are a multi-part epic on Numa Pompilius.

Form

Rímur, as the name suggests, rhyme, but like older Germanic alliterative verse, they also contain structural alliteration. Rímur are stanzaic, and stanzas normally have four lines. There are hundreds of ríma meters: Sveinbjörn Beinteinsson counts 450 variations in his Háttatal. But they can be grouped in approximately ten families. The most common metre is ferskeytt.

Ríma-poetry inherited kennings, heiti and other ornate features of medieval Icelandic poetic diction from skaldic verse. The language of rímur is likewise influenced by the rhetorical devices associated with late medieval geblümter Stil ('flowery style').

When they are long — as they usually are — rímur usually comprise several distinct sections, each being called a ríma, and each usually in a different metre. After the earliest rímur, it became conventional to begin each ríma in a cycle with a mansöngr, a lyric address, traditionally to or about a woman whom the poet supposedly loves, usually in vain.

History

The earliest rímur date from the fourteenth century, evolving from eddaic poetry and skaldic poetry with influences from Continental epic poems. Óláfs ríma Haraldssonar, preserved in Flateyjarbók, is the ríma attested in the oldest manuscript and is sometimes considered the oldest ríma; the earliest large collection of rímur is in Kollsbók, dated by Ólafur Halldórsson to 1480–90. Skíðaríma, Bjarkarímur, and Lokrur are other examples of early rímur. The key work on editing rímur focused on medieval examples like these and was undertaken by Finnur Jónsson. Rímur were usually adapted from existing prose sagas, and occasionally comprise the only surviving evidence for those sagas. One example of such a rímur is the fifteenth-century Skáld-Helga rímur.

Rímur were the mainstay of epic poetry in Iceland for centuries: 78 are known from before 1600, 138 from the seventeenth century, 248 from the eighteenth, 505 from the nineteenth and 75 from the twentieth. Most have never been printed and survive only in manuscripts, mostly in the National and University Library of Iceland: about one hundred and thirty popular editions of rímur were printed between 1800 and 1920, but there are more than one thousand nineteenth-century manuscripts containing rímur. In the large majority of cases the rímur cycles were composed on a subject about which a written story already existed. As a twist of fate, quite a number of now lost sagas now survive in the form of rímur composed based on them, and then the sagas were recomposed based on the corresponding rímur.

The twenty-first century has seen something of a revival of rímur in Icelandic popular music. The central figure in this revival has been Steindór Andersen, particularly noted for collaborations Sigur Rós (leading to the 2001 EP Rímur) and Hilmar Örn Hilmarsson (leading, for example, to the 2013 album Stafnbúi).

Critical reception

In the nineteenth century the poet Jónas Hallgrímsson published an influential critique on a rímur cycle by Sigurður Breiðfjörð and the genre as a whole. At the same time Jónas and other romantic poets were introducing new continental verse forms into Icelandic literature and the popularity of the rímur started to decline. Nevertheless, many of the most popular nineteenth- and twentieth-century Icelandic poets composed rímur, including Bólu-Hjálmar, Sigurður Breiðfjörð, Einar Benediktsson, Steinn Steinarr, Örn Arnarson and Þórarinn Eldjárn. In the late twentieth century Sveinbjörn Beinteinsson was the best known rímur poet. Steindór Andersen is currently the leading rímur singer in Iceland: he often collaborates with the band Sigur Rós and has also contributed to some of Hilmar Örn Hilmarsson's works.

The scholar Sigurður Nordal wrote on the rímur.

Through the ages numerous authors would probably have agreed with this statement, since there is a substantial number of rímur that were turned into prose sagas. However, it is worth mentioning that Nordal never denied the importance of rímur as an aspect of the history of literature, and in his lectures specifically emphasized their role in keeping the continuity of Icelandic literature, a subject close to his heart. He also recognized that among the mass of rímur composed, there were works of art to be found, although he was of the opinion that (according to his published lectures) none of the rímur might be called a "perfect work of art" with the possible exception of Skíðaríma. But a "perfect work of art" is somewhat hard to achieve.

Editions and further reading

Editions
 Colwill, Lee (trans.), Grettis rímur, Apardjón Journal for Scandinavian Studies (2021)
 Colwill Lee and Haukur Þorgeirsson (ed. and trans.), The Bearded Bride: a critical edition of Þrymlur (London: Viking Society for Northern Research, 2020)
 W. A. Craigie (ed.), Icelandic Ballads on the Gowrie Conspiracy (Oxford: Clarendon Press, 1908). [Edition of Einar Guðmundsson's Skotlands rímur.]
 Finnur Jónsson (ed.), Fernir forníslenskir rímnaflokkar (Copenhagen, 1896). ["Four Old Icelandic Rímur Cycles": edition of Lokrur, Þrymlur, Griplur and Völsungsrímur.]
 Finnur Jónsson (ed.), Rímnasafn: Samling af de ældste islandske rimer, Samfund til udgivelse af gammel nordisk litteratur, 35, 2 vols (Copenhagen: Møller and Jørgensen, 1905–22). [Edition of the earliest rímur.]

Resources
 Finnur Jónsson, Ordbog til de af Samfund til Udg. ad Gml. Nord. Litteratur Udgivne Rímur samt til de af Dr. O. Jiriczek Udgivne Bósarimur (Copenhagen: Jørgensen, 1926–28). [Dictionary of early rímur.]
 Finnur Sigmundsson, Rímnatal (Reykjavík: Rímnafélagið, 1966). [Catalogue of rímur.]
 Ísmús [online Icelandic archive of traditional oral and musical culture]

Key studies
 Davíð Erlingsson, 'Rímur', Íslensk þjóðmenning VI. Munnmenntir og bókmenning, ed. by Frosti F. Jóhannsson (Reykjavík: Þjóðsaga, 1989), pp. 330–55.
 Hallfreður Örn Eiríksson, 'On Icelandic Rímur: An Orientation', Arv, 31 (1975), 139–150.
 Svend Nielsen, Rímnakveðskapur tíu kvæðamanna: Rannsókn á tilbrigðum, ed. and trans. by Rósa Þorsteinsdóttir (Reykjavík: Stofnun Árna Magnússonar í Íslenskum Fræðum, 2022), 
 Sverrir Tómasson, 'Hlutverk rímna í íslensku samfélagi á síðari hluta miðalda', Ritið, 5.3 (2005), 77–94.

Notes

References

 Neijmann, Daisy L. (1996). The Icelandic Voice in Canadian Letters: The Contribution of Icelandic-Canadian Writers to Canadian Literature. McGill-Queen's Press. 
 Hreinn Steingrímsson. (2000). KVÆDASKAPUR: Icelandic Epic Song. Dorothy Stone and Stephen L. Mosko (eds.).

External links 
 KVÆDASKAPUR: Icelandic Epic Song, by Hreinn Steingrímsson. A study of rímur that focuses on 16 performers in the Breiðafjörður region. Includes recordings and transcriptions.
 Kvæðamennafélagið Iðunn Eponymous homepage of a society devoted to the revival of traditional Icelandic singing. Includes information in Icelandic on traditional performance styles, and an online edition of Bragfræði og Háttatal by Sveinbjörn Beinteinsson which catalogues the meters used by rímur poets, with examples performed by the author.
 Historical recordings of rímur in Icelandic sound archives. In Icelandic, but clicking on the recording number (in the Safnmark column) will load the recording.
 Recordings of Sigurður Bárðarson (1940) and his son Otto (1939) chanting rímur, recorded by Sidney Robertson Cowell (California Gold: Northern California Folk Music from the Thirties Collection).
 CFUV radio Interview with Matthew Driscoll from the University of Copenhagen about his Beck Trust lecture, ″The Icelandic Rimur” at the University of Victoria.
 "The Icelandic Rímur" (powerpoint presentation for Matthew Driscoll's Beck Lecture on "The Icelandic Rimur.″)

 
Icelandic literature
Icelandic music